The Tawitawi brown dove (Phapitreron cinereiceps) is a threatened species of bird in the family Columbidae noted for its orange-peach breast. It is endemic to forests in the Sulu Archipelago (islands of Tawi-Tawi and Sanga-Sanga) in the Philippines. Until recently it was considered conspecific with the Mindanao brown dove and collectively called the dark-eared brown dove. Although threatened by habitat loss, the rate of loss significantly reduced from 2004 to 2007, and it was thus downlisted from Critically Endangered to Endangered status in the 2007 IUCN Red List.

Description and Taxonomy 
EBird describes the bird as "A medium-sized dove of lowland secondary forest on Tawi-Tawi Island, where it is the only brown-dove. Dark brown above with a gray head, purplish iridescence on the back of the neck, rufous-brown underparts from the throat to the belly, white under the base of the tail, and a pale gray tail tip. Does not resemble any other similarly sized doves in its range. Sings an accelerating series on the same pitch, ending in a trill, “dup-dup-dup-du-du-d-d-drrrrr,” reminiscent of a ping-pong ball falling on a table."

Habitat and Conservation Status 
Its natural habitats are  tropical moist lowland secondary forests  and forest edge with it being less common in primary forest. It being more common in these areas shows that it is tolerant of degraded forests .

The IUCN Red List classifies this bird as an endangered species with population estimates of 250 to 999 mature individuals  This species' main threat is habitat loss with wholesale clearance of forest habitats as a result of legal and illegal logging, mining and conversion into farmlands through Slash-and-burn and urbanization. Hunting and trapping also occurs despite laws against these practices.

There are no protected areas in the archipelago. A project proposal exists to provide conservation funding for the Tawitawi/Sulu Coastal Area.

There are no species specific conservation programs going on at the moment.

Footnotes

References
 BirdLife International (2007a): 2006-2007 Red List status changes. Retrieved 2007-AUG-26.
 BirdLife International (2007b): Tawitawi Brown Dove - BirdLife Species Factsheet. Retrieved 2007-AUG-26.

Tawitawi brown dove
Fauna of Tawi-Tawi
Tawitawi brown dove
Tawitawi brown dove
Tawitawi brown dove
Taxonomy articles created by Polbot